Two Memories is a 1909 American silent short drama film directed by D. W. Griffith. The film marks the onscreen debut of Mary Pickford.

Cast
 Marion Leonard as Marion Francis
 David Miles as Henry Lawrence
 Mary Pickford as Marion's Sister
 Charles Avery as Party Guest
 Clara T. Bracy
 John R. Cumpson as Party Guest
 Robert Harron
 Anita Hendrie as Party Guest
 Arthur V. Johnson as Party Guest
 Florence Lawrence as Party Guest
 Owen Moore as Party Guest
 Anthony O'Sullivan as Servant
 Lottie Pickford
 Herbert Prior as Party Guest
 Gertrude Robinson as Party Guest
 Mack Sennett as Party Guest

See also
 Mary Pickford filmography

References

External links
 

1909 films
1909 drama films
1909 short films
Silent American drama films
American silent short films
American black-and-white films
Films directed by D. W. Griffith
1900s American films